Rogelio Romero Torres (born 23 February 1995) is a Mexican boxer in the light heavyweight (-81 kg) discipline. 

Romero won the bronze medal at the 2014 and 2018 Central American and Caribbean Games as well as the 2015 and 2019 Pan American Games. He obtained a quota for the 2020 Summer Olympics.

References

1995 births
Living people
Sportspeople from Ciudad Juárez
Mexican male boxers
Olympic boxers of Mexico
Boxers at the 2020 Summer Olympics
Medalists at the 2019 Pan American Games
Pan American Games medalists in boxing
Boxers at the 2019 Pan American Games
Competitors at the 2018 Central American and Caribbean Games
Central American and Caribbean Games medalists in boxing
Lightweight boxers
Boxers from Chihuahua (state)
Pan American Games bronze medalists for Mexico